Waeng Noi is a district (amphoe) in the southwestern part of Khon Kaen province, northeastern Thailand.

Geography
Neighboring districts are (from the north clockwise): Waeng Yai and Phon of Khon Kaen Province; Bua Lai, Bua Yai, and Kaeng Sanam Nang of Nakhon Ratchasima province; and Khon Sawan of Chaiyaphum province.

History
The minor district (king amphoe) was created on 1 June 1971, when six tambons were split off from Phon district. It was upgraded to a full district on 21 August 1975.

Administration
The district is divided into six subdistricts (tambons), which are further subdivided into 73 villages (mubans). Waeng Noi is a township (thesaban tambon) which covers parts of tambon Waeng Noi. There are a further six tambon administrative organizations (TAO).

References

External links
amphoe.com

Waeng Noi